Metropolitan Ireney (Patron Saint St. Irenaeus of Lyons, secular name John Bekish, born Ivan Dmitriyevich Bekish, ; 2 October 1892, Mezhirech, Lublin Province (now Poland) – 18 March 1981, Staten Island, New York) was the primate of the Orthodox Church in America (OCA) from 1965 until his retirement in 1977. He was succeeded by Metropolitan Theodosius (Lazor).

Metr. Ireney was involved in the negotiations that led to the granting of autocephaly in 1970 to the OCA, which had previously been under the jurisdiction of the Russian Orthodox Church. As the primate of a now-autocephalous Church, Metr. Ireney was granted the title of His Beatitude.

Notes and references

1892 births
1981 deaths
Bishops of the Orthodox Church in America
People from Staten Island
Primates of the Orthodox Church in America
20th-century Eastern Orthodox archbishops
20th-century American clergy